The iPad is an iPadOS-based (previously iOS) line of tablet computers designed and developed by Apple Inc.; it has a wide variety of accessories made by Apple available for it, including a screen cover specifically for the respective models of iPad called Smart Cover, as well as a number of accessories to allow the iPad to connect to other devices, some of which enable non-touchscreen input.

List of accessories by Apple

References

External links
 

Accessories
iPad accessories